Asian Californians are residents of the state of California who are of Asian ancestry. California has the largest Asian American population in the U.S., and second highest proportion of Asian American residents, after Hawaii. As of the 2020 U.S. Census, there were over 6 million Asian-Americans in California; 15.5% of the state's population. If including those with partial Asian ancestry, this figure is around 17%. This is a jump from 13.8% recorded in 2010.

The largest Asian American ethnic subgroups in California are Filipino Americans, Chinese Americans, Vietnamese Americans, and Indian Americans. Asian Americans in California are concentrated in the San Francisco and Los Angeles metropolitan areas.

Background
Including those with partial Asian ancestry, the following Asian ethnic groups in California are: Filipino (3.9%, 1,474,707), Chinese (except Taiwanese; 3.6%, 1,349,111), Vietnamese	(647,589, 1.7%), Indians (590,445, 1.5%), Koreans (505,225, 1.3%), Japanese (428,014, 1.1%), Taiwanese (109,928, 0.2%), Cambodians (102,317, 0.2%), Hmong (91,224, 0.2%), Laotians (69,303, 0.2%), Thai (67,707, 0.1%), Pakistanis (53,474, 0.1%), Indonesians (39,506, 0.1%), Burmese (17,978, 0.05%), Sri Lankans (11,929, 0.03%), Bangladeshis (10,494, 0.03%), Nepalese (6,231, 0.01%), Malaysians (5,595, 0.01%), Mongolians (4,993, 0.1%), Singaporeans (1,513, 0.004%), Okinawans (1,377, 0.003%), and Bhutanese (750, 0.001%).

Economical
Asians have the highest income per capita in the US, and may have a slightly above average rate in California. However, income average varies with Asian groups, from Cambodians and Hmong to Taiwanese and Indians.

Asians make up approximately 2-4% of homeless in California, which is low, but communities exist especially in San Francisco and San Jose.

While a large proportion of Asian Americans have higher educational attainments and median income averages, many Asian American groups, often those coming from low-income Southeast Asian families, face hardships such as poverty, depression, emotional and domestic abuse, racial bullying, and gang violence. Cambodian and Southeast Asian-dominant street gangs such as the Asian Boyz, which is an off-shoot of the African American and Los Angeles based Crips gang, formed in Los Angeles County the late 1970s to the 1980s during the Cambodian refuge migration to the U.S, especially in Long Beach, Fresno, Sacramento, Oakland, St. Paul, Minnesota, and Lowell, Massachusetts.

Often, these gangs would fight with Hispanic gangs but would eventually shift into fighting with fellow Cambodia and Asian gang members, mostly with rival Asian gangs or criminals/dealers. This violence over drugs, turf, and arguments would sometimes lead to violence and murders, and violence involving innocent children and families during home invasions have been reported in the San Bernardino area in the 1990s and elsewhere.

Education
Asian Americans and immigrants have a high student body percentage among many California colleges; UC Berkeley is about 40% Asian.

Ethnic Groups

Cambodian
There are many Cambodians in Long Beach, Stockton, and Fresno. Long Beach is 4% Cambodian with over 20,000 people of Cambodian residents. There is a Cambodiatown in LB. There is a Cambodian population in Oakland, and there were, and to a lesser extent today, Cambodian communities in Tenderloin, San Francisco.

Chinese

San Francisco is 21.4% Chinese, and the San Francisco Bay Area is 8% Chinese. Many of the Chinese Americans are  Cantonese-speaking immigrants or descendants from Guangdong province and Hong Kong. There are also many Taiwanese and mainland Chinese immigrants in the Silicon Valley area.

The Bay Area in general is 8-9% Chinese. Many live in Santa Clara County, with many prevalent in Cupertino, Sunnyvale, and Milpitas. In the East Bay, many in San Ramon, Dublin, Pleasanton, Oakland, Walnut Creek, and Piedmont. Berkeley has many Chinese in the area; UC Berkeley is about 20% Chinese. On the Peninsula, there are many Chinese Americans in Daly City, San Mateo, San Bruno, and Foster City.

Northern California and America at large’s Chinese population largely originated in the Taishan area, with at least half of Chinese Americans in the 1980s reporting some or all Taishanese ancestry. Nearby cities such as Zhongshan had larger emigration waves to the US and/or California. There were also some Shanghainese immigrants coming into the Bay Area to a lesser extent during the 70s-80s.

Sacramento is 3-5% Chinese. Davis has many Asian American residents and students at UC Davis. Elk Grove has a Chinese community.

Los Angeles is 1.8% Chinese, and Los Angeles County is 4% Chinese. A large portion of the Chinese population resides in the San Gabriel Valley. Areas with notable Chinese and Chinese-American populations include Chinatown, parts of San Fernando Valley, and Westwood in Los Angeles, the San Gabriel Valley/ the 626 (Arcadia, Alhambra, El Monte, Monterey Park, Rosemead, San Gabriel, Temple City), Rowland Heights, Diamond Bar, Hacienda Heights, and the Los Angeles County/Orange County border cities of Cerritos and Artesia. Chinatown in Los Angeles is populated by mostly working-class Cantonese and mainland Chinese while the western San Gabriel Valley has a diverse Chinese and Taiwanese population. Rowland Heights and the Eastern San Gabriel Valley is mainly populated by Taiwanese.

In Orange County, Irvine has a large Chinese and Taiwanese population.

San Diego has Chinese communities in Torrey Pines and Ranchos Penasquitos, and there are sizeable numbers in other County cities such as Carlsbad and Poway.

Filipino 

The majority of Filipinos in California reside in the Greater Los Angeles area. According to a 2013 study, there are 1.5 million Filipino Americans in California, making them one of the largest Asian ethnic groups in the state. Since 2018 the population has grown to 1.6 million according to some sources.

Hmong 

As of the 2010 census, a little over 91,000 Hmong live in California alone, out of the total 260,000 in the country. They mainly live in Fresno, Merced, Sacramento, and Stockton areas.

Indian 
Little India, Artesia, California

California has the most Indian Americans in terms of sheer number, but percentage-wise, the U.S. state with the highest number of Indian Americans is New Jersey, and the U.S. city as well as metropolitan area with the highest absolute number of Indians is New York City. California is about 1.3% Indian, with many living in Orange County and Santa Clara County. Many live in Yuba City, about 15% Indian, which has a significant Sikh community.

Indonesian 
Los Angeles, California is home to the largest population of Indonesians in America, with Riverside, California having the second largest population.

Japanese 

California contains five of the top 10 metropolitan cities with the greatest Japanese population in the United States. Los Angeles, San Francisco, San Jose, San Diego, and Sacramento have the largest Japanese populations in California, with Los Angeles having more than the other cities combined. 
There are several areas of California that held assembly centers and internment camps (also known as relocation centers) where Japanese Americans were forced to relocate to after the Attack on Pearl Harbor, such as Arcadia(Santa Anita Racetrack), Fresno(Fresno Fairgrounds), Arboga, Merced, Owens Valley(Manzanar War Relocation Center), Pinedale(Pinedale, California), Pomona(Fairplex), Sacramento(Camp Kohler), Salinas(California Rodeo Salinas), San Bruno(Tanforan), Stockton, California(San Joaquin County Fairgrounds), Tulare, Turlock(Stanislaus County Fairgrounds), and Woodland. The Tule Lake War Relocation Center in Modoc County was the biggest of the 10 internment camps in its prime.

Korean 

Koreans make up 16% of the Asian Pacific Islander (API) community in Los Angeles County, the highest percentage in the entire country. In the API community of California, Koreans comprise 9% of the population, but only 1% of the total population.

There are many Koreans in Fullerton and Irvine in Orange County, and a significant community in Cupertino, Santa Clara and San Francisco.

Laotian 
California is the top state in the country with the largest Laotian population, which as of 2015 is 271,000 across the country. Among the population of Laotians, Hmong people are counted as well. They are mostly in Northern and Central California, in Oakland, Richmond, Fresno, Sacramento and Stockton. There are some in Southeast San Diego.

Malaysian 
Los Angeles is second to New York in terms of Malay population, however the combined population of Malay in Los Angeles and San Francisco is equal to New York.

Taiwanese 

Los Angeles is home to the largest percentage of Taiwanese Americans in the country. There is a Little Taipei, and Hacienda Heights and Monterey Park both have large Taiwanese communities.

Thai 

California possesses the largest Thai population outside of Asia, and is the only state in the country that has a designated "Thai Town," which is also the first of its kind globally.

Of the 5.6 million Asian people in California, approximately 68,000 are Thai, which is 28.5% of the entire Thai population in the United States.

Vietnamese
Totally (647,589, 1.7%) Vietnamese in California .

San Jose is 10% Vietnamese, and the San Francisco Bay Area has a sizable Vietnamese population. Other areas of Santa Clara County like Milpitas, and Alameda County’s Fremont is home to many. Chinatown, San Francisco and Tenderloin, San Francisco have communities.

Orange County has a large Vietnamese population, with much of the population in Garden Grove and Westminster, which contains a Little Saigon. There are also smaller but significant Vietnamese communities in Anaheim and Santa Ana in Orange County.

There is a Vietnamese population in San Diego County. Little Saigon, San Diego in City Heights has a Vietnamese community, and they can be found in Ranchos Penasquitos.

Demographics

Notable people 
This is a list of notable people of Asian descent who were either born, raised, or spent a significant amount of time in their formative years in California.

Art & Design 

 David Choe
 Gyo Obata

Fashion 

 Chanel Iman
 Jen Kao
 Derek Lam
 Humberto Leon
 Carol Lim
 Peter Som
 Alexander Wang

Business 

 Tony Hsieh
 Johnny Kan
 Noel Lee
 Eric Ly
 Bobby Murphy
 Kevin Tsujihara
 William Wang
 Jerry Yang

Culinary 

 Roy Choi
 Ming Tsai
 Jennifer Yee

Entertainment

Acting & Filmmaking 

 Eric Byler
 John Cho
 Rosalind Chao
 Jamie Chung
 Justin Chon
 Pat Morita
 Brenda Song
 Hailee Steinfeld
 Rob Schneider
 George Takei
 Ashley Argota
 Johnny Yong Bosch
 Todd Haberkorn
 Janice Kawaye
 Dante Basco
 Dion Basco
 Karin Anna Cheung
 Richard Chew
 Margaret Cho
 Justin Chon
 Darren Criss
 Jake Cuenca
 Ivan Dorschner
 Griffin Gluck
 Mark-Paul Gosselaar
 Rene Gube
 Vanessa Anne Hudgens
 David Henry Hwang
 Dwayne Johnson
 Rodney Kageyama
 Michael Kang (director)
 Tim Kang
 Lance Krall
 Jennie Kwan
 Bobby Lee
 Brandon Lee
 Chris Chan Lee
 Jason Scott Lee
 Ki Hong Lee
 Shannon Lee
 Lee Tung Foo
 Justin Lin
 Julia Ling
 Marie Matiko
 Matthew Moy
 Robert A. Nakamura
 Minae Noji
 Haing Ngor
 Steve Nguyen
 Eva Noblezada
 Masi Oka
 Yuji Okumoto
 Lisa Onodera
 Grace Park
 Randall Park
 Dat Phan
 Lindsay Price
 Ke Huy Quan
 Navi Rawat
 Ernie Reyes Jr.
 Sab Shimono
 Jack Soo
 Pat Suzuki
 Faran Tahir
 Chris Tashima
 Jennifer Tilly
 Meg Tilly
 Thuy Trang
 Daya Vaidya
 Lalaine
 Kelly Vitz
 Garrett Wang
 BD Wong
 Anna May Wong
 Victor Wong
 Daniel Wu
 Jessica Yu
 Kelvin Yu

Dance 

 Dana Tai Soon Burgess
 Dominic Sandoval
 Lawrence Kao
 Jabbawockeez
 Poreotics
 We Are Heroes

Music 

 Conan Gray
 Hayley Kiyoko
 Steve Aoki
 Traphik
 Dumbfoundead
 Jocelyn Enriquez
 Nichkhun Horvejkul
 Joshua Hong- member of the K-pop group Seventeen
 Tiffany Hwang
 Jessica Jung
 Krystal
 Nicole Jung
 Eli Kim
 Kevin Woo
 Mark Tuan- member of the K-pop group Got7
 Amber Liu
 Lena Park
 Kero One
 Dan the Automator
 Tony Kanal
 Mike Park
 Simon Tam
 Apl.de.ap
 DJ Qbert
 Mike Relm
 Shing02
 Mike Shinoda
 Joseph Hahn
 Tyga
 Vienna Teng
 Alex Van Halen
 Eddie Van Halen
 Vanness Wu
 Nicky Lee (singer)
 Far East Movement
 IAMMEDIC
 KeyKool
 DJ Rhettmatic
 Saweetie
 Jhené Aiko
 Olivia Rodrigo

Television 

 Christine Ha
 Tammy Jih
 Poreotics
 Quest Crew
 Jessica Sanchez
 Jeannie Mai Jenkins

Law 

 Morgan Chu
 Viet D. Dinh
 Heather Fong
 Lance Ito
 Fred Korematsu
 Dale Minami
 Debra Wong Yang
 John F. Aiso
 Tani Cantil-Sakauye
 Edward M. Chen
 Vince Chhabria

Literature 

 Nellie Wong
 Shawn Wong
 Jade Snow Wong
 Judy Yung
 Laurence Yep
 Charles Yu
 Lisa Yee
 Gene Luen Yang
 Wakako Yamauchi
 Karen Tei Yamashita
 Hisaye Yamamoto
 Merle Woo
 Yoshiko Uchida
 Gail Tsukiyama
 Truong Tran
 Timothy Tau
 Amy Tan
 Craig Santos Perez
 Viet Thanh Nguyen
 Fae Myenne Ng
 An Na
 Toshio Mori
 Sally Wen Mao
 Aimee Phan
 Nina Revoyr
 Barbara Jane Reyes
 Shawna Yang Ryan
 Albert Saijo
 Yumi Sakugawa
 Lisa See
 Brenda Shaughnessy
 Him Mark Lai
 Alexandra Kleeman
 Katie Kitamura
 Maxine Hong Kingston
 Ronyoung Kim
 Porochista Khakpour
 Hiroshi Kashiwagi
 Soji Kashiwagi
 Le Thi Diem Thuy
 Gus Lee
 Helie Lee
 Krys Lee
 Joseph O. Legaspi
 Russell Leong
 Sandra Lim
 Timothy Liu
 Jessica Hagedorn
 Vince Gotera
 Philip Kan Gotanda
 Prince Gomolvilas
 Eugene Gloria
 Tess Gerritsen
 Jamie Ford
 Ben Fee
 Khaled Hosseini
 Jeanne Wakatsuki Houston
 David Henry Hwang
 Ai
 Noel Alumit
 Rick Barot
 Steph Cha
 Theresa Hak Kyung Cha
 Daniyal Mueenuddin
 Do Nguyen Mai
 Margaret Dilloway
 Frank Chin
 Cathy Linh Che
 Melissa de la Cruz
 Han Ong
 Whilce Portacio

Military 

 Dan Choi
 Susan Ahn Cuddy
 Rudolph Davila
 Joe Hayashi
 Young-Oak Kim
 Kurt Lee
 Eleanor Mariano
 Susan K. Mashiko
 Roy Matsumoto
 Sadao Munemori
 Kiyoshi K. Muranaga
 Joe M. Nishimoto
 Kazuo Otani
 Eldon Regua
 George T. Sakato
 Ted T. Tanouye
 John C. Young

News, Media, & Journalism 

 Christine Chen
 Lanhee Chen
 Veronica De La Cruz
 Lisa Ling
 Richard Lui
 Kent Ninomiya
 Iva Toguri D'Aquino
 Ben Fong-Torres
 Michael Yamashita

Politics 

 Larry Asera
 Lisa Bartlett
 Thelma Buchholdt
 David S. Chang
 Ling Ling Chang
 Tyler Diep
 Charles Djou
 Andrew Do
 Matt Fong
 Sam Hayakawa
 Kamala Harris
 Mike Honda
 Jay Kim
 Young Kim
 Doris Matsui
 Norman Mineta
 Janet Nguyen
 Sean Reyes
 Harry Sidhu
 Michelle Steel
 Mark Takano
 Nao Takasugi
 Van Tran
 Leana Wen

Religion 

 Randolph Roque Calvo
 Francis Chan

Science 

 Michio Kaku
 Leroy Chiao

Sports 

 Bobby Balcena
 Tedy Bruschi
 Brandon Chillar
 Tiffany Chin
 Amy Chow
 Patrick Chung
 Natalie Coughlin
 Kris Dim
 Victoria Manalo Draves
 Tommy Edman
 Ariel Hsing
 Haley Ishimatsu
 Anthony Kim
 Chloe Kim
 Tommy Kono
 Michelle Kwan
 Kyle Larson
 Cung Le
 Sammy Lee
 Jeremy Lin
 Alexander Massialas
 Mirai Nagasu
 Dave Roberts
 Kyla Ross
 Eric Sato
 Liane Sato
 Kevin Tan
 Tiger Woods
 Kristi Yamaguchi
 Tabitha Yim
 Al Young
 Caroline Zhang

See also 

 List of Asian American writers
 List of Asian Americans in STEM fields
 Military History of Asian Americans
 List of Asian American jurists

References

External links

 Hispanics: California's Next Majority, The New York Times